Ang Kami Sherpa was the member of the third Indian Everest expedition, led by Captain M S Kohliin 1965 which was first Indian successful Everest Expedition  climbed  Mount Everest, consisted of 21 major expedition members and 50 Sherpas. The initial attempt was at the end of April 1965, when they returned to base camp due to bad weather and waited 2 weeks for better weather.
Together with C. P. Vohra Ang Kami reached on the summit on 24 May 1965. He is the fifth Indian and twentieth person in the world that climbed Mount Everest.

Honors and awards 
He was awarded Arjuna award and Padma Shri  for his achievements. He was also awarded the gold medal by the Indian Mountaineering Foundation.

References

See also
Indian summiters of Mount Everest - Year wise
List of Mount Everest records of India
List of Mount Everest records
List of Mount Everest summiters by number of times to the summit

1970 deaths
Indian summiters of Mount Everest
Sherpa summiters of Mount Everest
Indian mountain climbers
Mountaineering deaths
Recipients of the Padma Shri in sports
Recipients of the Arjuna Award

Recipients of Indian Mountaineering Foundation's Gold Medal